Dearly Departed are a rock band from Long Island, New York. They are said to be similar to bands Dredg, Codeseven, Sunny Day Real Estate and Mineral, and have appeared in Good Times Magazine.

History
Formed in late 2001, they consisted of vocalist Mike Mallamo (formerly of Inside), bassist Joe Rubino (of Tension and the Jett Blackk Heart Attack), guitarist Jon Cox (also of Tension, and the Jett Blackk Heart Attack Earthling Massive and From Autumn to Ashes), guitarist Jeff Bodzer (from Helen of Troy), and drummer Danny Lopez (of Scarab). They released their first album produced by Jonathan Florencio, "Believing in Ghosts", in February 2003, after which the band toured and supported acts such as From Autumn to Ashes, Avenged Sevenfold, NORA, and Superstitions of the Sky.
Between releasing Believing in Ghosts and What Awaits Us, the band had undergone many changes in lineup. The band even broke up briefly in 2005 when Bodzer moved to Florida, and Mallamo focused on his new band, Novena.

Recently, Dearly Departed has returned to the original lineup and become a 6 piece added guitarist Derek Sessions.

Reception 
Critic Rafer Guzman praised Mike Mallamo's "high, spooky vocals" in a concert review. In a generally positive review of the album Believing in Ghosts, he wrote, "Taking cues from metal and punk, the five-piece band storms its way through crunching rock riffs with roiling drums and singer Mike Mallamo's apoplectic roar."

Members
Mike Mallamo – vocals
Joe Rubino – Bass
Jeff Bodzer – Guitar
Derek Sessions – Guitar
Danny Lopez – drums

Past members
Ryan Albrecht – Guitar
Ryan Luken – Guitar (live)
John Cox – Guitar (What Awaits Us)

Discography

Studio albums
Believing in Ghosts, 2004 (One Day Savior Recordings)
What Awaits Us, 2007

EPs
The Remains of Marianne Mayweather, 2002 (One Day Savior Recordings)

References

External links
DearlyDepartedMusic.com (Official)
Official MySpace
Official Purevolume
What Awaits Us album review by scenepointblank.com

Alternative rock groups from New York (state)
Progressive rock musical groups from New York (state)
2001 establishments in New York (state)
Musical groups established in 2001